is a Japanese singer. He has several singles and albums that have charted on the Oricon charts, including "Zutto", which reached number 12 on the Oricon Singles Chart, and "Kimi Koi Calendar", which peaked at number 13, both in 2012. His album Hajimemashite reached number 27 on the Oricon Albums Chart.

Discography

Studio album

Extended plays

Singles

Notes

References

External links
 

1991 births
Anime musicians
Japanese male singer-songwriters
Japanese singer-songwriters
Living people
Musicians from Sapporo
Sacra Music artists
Sony Music Entertainment Japan artists
21st-century Japanese singers
21st-century Japanese male singers